The Connemara Heritage and History Centre, also called Dan O'Hara's Homestead, is an open-air museum in the village of Lettershea, near the town of Clifden (Irish: An Clochán), County Galway, in the Connemara region, Ireland.   It was established in the late 1980s.

The centre's attractions include audiovisual and history presentations, as well as outdoor exhibits including reconstructions of a crann óg, a ring fort, and a clochán. Also on the grounds are the Dan O'Hara Homestead and pre-famine farm.

It also served as the first "Pit Stop" on The Amazing Race 12.

References

External links
Connemara Heritage & History Centre official site

Tourist attractions in County Galway
1980s establishments in Ireland
Farm museums in the Republic of Ireland
Museums in County Galway
Open-air museums in the Republic of Ireland